Olofströms IK is an ice hockey club in Sweden. They have played in Division 1 since the 2003-04 season.

Season-by-season record
updated December 2, 2013

Current roster

References

 
Ice hockey teams in Sweden
Ice hockey teams in Blekinge County